Belgium participated in the Eurovision Song Contest 2005 with the song "Le grand soir" written by Alec Mansion and Frédéric Zeitoun. The song was performed by Nuno Resende. The Belgian entry for the 2005 contest in Kyiv, Ukraine was selected through the national final Finale Nationale Concours Eurovision de la Chanson 2005, organised by the Walloon broadcaster Radio Télévision Belge de la Communauté Française (RTBF). In the final on 20 March 2005 which featured two competing entries, "Le grand soir" performed by Nuno Resende was selected as the winner after gaining 50.2% of the public televote.

Belgium competed in the semi-final of the Eurovision Song Contest which took place on 19 May 2005. Performing during the show in position 11, "Le grand soir" was not announced among the top 10 entries of the semi-final and therefore did not qualify to compete in the final. It was later revealed that Belgium placed twenty-second out of the 25 participating countries in the semi-final with 29 points.

Background

In 2004, Xandee represented the country with the song "1 Life" and placed twenty-second in the final.

The Belgian broadcaster for the 2005 contest, who broadcasts the event in Belgium and organises the selection process for its entry, was Radio Télévision Belge de la Communauté Française (RTBF). The Belgian participation in the contest alternates between two broadcasters: the Flemish Vlaamse Radio- en Televisieomroeporganisatie (VRT) and the Walloon RTBF. Both broadcasters have selected the Belgian entry using national finals and internal selections in the past. In 2003, RTBF internally selected both the artist and song that would represent the nation, while in 2004, VRT organised the national final Eurosong in order to select the Belgian entry. On 20 October 2004, RTBF confirmed Belgium's participation in the 2005 Eurovision Song Contest and held a national final to select their entry.

Before Eurovision

Finale Nationale Concours Eurovision de la Chanson 2005 
Finale Nationale Concours Eurovision de la Chanson 2005 was the national final that selected Belgium's entry in the Eurovision Song Contest 2005. The competition, which simultaneously celebrated the 50th anniversary of the Eurovision Song Contest, consisted of a final on 20 March 2005 where the winning song and artist were selected. The show took place at the RTBF studios in Brussels, hosted by Jean-Pierre Hautier and Jean-Louis Lahaye and was broadcast on La Une as well as via radio on VivaCité.

Competing entries 
A submission period was opened on 20 October 2004 for record companies and members of SABAM to submit their proposals until 3 January 2005. Both artists and composers were required to be Belgian or have resided in Belgium for three years, while songs were required to be performed mainly in French. Five entries were shortlisted by an eight-member committee from the 170 received during the submission period, and the two acts selected for the competition following a live audition were announced on 10 March 2005.

Final 
The final took place on 20 March 2005 where two entries competed. The winner, "Le grand soir" performed by Nuno Resende, was selected solely by public televoting.

At Eurovision
According to Eurovision rules, all nations with the exceptions of the host country, the "Big Four" (France, Germany, Spain and the United Kingdom) and the ten highest placed finishers in the 2004 contest are required to qualify from the semi-final on 19 May 2005 in order to compete for the final on 21 May 2005; the top ten countries from the semi-final progress to the final. On 22 March 2005, a special allocation draw was held which determined the running order for the semi-final and Belgium was set to perform in position 11, following the entry from Iceland and before the entry from Estonia. At the end of the semi-final, Belgium was not announced among the top 10 entries and therefore failed to qualify to compete in the final. It was later revealed that Belgium placed twenty-second in the semi-final, receiving a total of 29 points.

The semi-final and the final were broadcast in Belgium by both the Flemish and Walloon broadcasters. VRT broadcast the shows on één with commentary in Dutch by André Vermeulen and Anja Daems. RTBF televised the shows on La Une with commentary in French by Jean-Pierre Hautier and Jean-Louis Lahaye. All shows were also broadcast by RTBF on La Première with commentary in French by Patrick Duhamel and Carlo de Pascale, and by VRT on Radio 2 with commentary in Dutch by Julien Put and Michel Follet. The Belgian spokesperson, who announced the Belgian votes during the final, was Armelle Gysen.

Voting 
Below is a breakdown of points awarded to Belgium and awarded by Belgium in the semi-final and grand final of the contest. The nation awarded its 12 points to the Netherlands in the semi-final and to Greece in the final of the contest.

Points awarded to Belgium

Points awarded by Belgium

References

External links
Belgian National Final page

2005
Countries in the Eurovision Song Contest 2005
Eurovision